Saroj Thanasunti is a Thai diplomat. He has served in various diplomatic roles, and has been Ambassador of Thailand to Chile, to El Salvador, and to Costa Rica since 2016.

Career
Saroj studied economics, Finance and Banking at the University of the Thai Chamber of Commerce, and has a master's degree in Management and Human Relations from Abilene Christian University. During his diplomatic career Saroj served in the Thai embassies in Seoul, Mexico City and Washington, D.C., and in the  Thai Ministry of Foreign Affairs. He worked in the ministry's Latin America Division, and in the American and South Pacific Affairs, European Affairs, and Protocol Departments, becoming assistant general director of the Protocol Department in 2011.

Saroj was appointed Ambassador of Thailand to Chile, and presented his letter of credence to President of Chile Michelle Bachelet at La Moneda Palace on 3 March 2016, in the presence of Minister of Foreign Affairs Heraldo Muñoz. In this post he was also dually accredited as the non-resident ambassador to El Salvador, and to Costa Rica. He presented his letter of credence to President of Costa Rica Luis Guillermo Solís on 7 September 2016, and to President of El Salvador Sánchez Cerén on 23 August 2017. As of May 2020 he is currently also Minister Counsellor at the Thai embassy in Mexico, dually accredited to Belize. He is married to Ganista Thanasunti.

References 

Living people
Saroj Thanasunti
Ambassadors of Thailand to Chile
Ambassadors of Thailand to El Salvador
Ambassadors of Thailand to Costa Rica
Saroj Thanasunti
Abilene Christian University alumni
Year of birth missing (living people)